Farm Content is a historic home located at Westminster, Carroll County, Maryland, United States. It is a two-story brick structure, five bays wide at the principal façade and built about 1795.  It is one of the finest examples of rural Federal architecture in Carroll County, and as the home of David Shriver, progenitor of the Shriver family in Maryland.

Farm Content was listed on the National Register of Historic Places in 1975.

References

External links
, including undated photo, at Maryland Historical Trust

Houses on the National Register of Historic Places in Maryland
Houses in Carroll County, Maryland
Houses completed in 1795
Federal architecture in Maryland
Westminster, Maryland
National Register of Historic Places in Carroll County, Maryland